Minileaks is a non-profit organization whose aim is to promote freedom of speech and civil justice in Spain. Inspired by the ideals of the 2011 Spanish protests 15-M movement, the project was founded in 2010 by journalists Eduardo Laporte and Iñigo Antolín and garnered significant attention from the Spanish and Latin American media

The collective's chief modus operandi is to publicize cases of corporate or government wrongdoing against individuals, using documentary evidence obtained by the victim to verify the reports.  Cases are submitted anonymously via email or post.

The project has been on an indeterminate hiatus since Spring 2013, although it maintains an active social media presence.

See also
 WikiLeaks

References

Further reading 
  Nace minileaks, la web 'made in Spain' de las filtraciones – Asuntos sociales – Noticias, última hora, vídeos y fotos de Asuntos sociales en lainformacion.com
  El muro de los grandes valores - Blogs lanacion.com
  El Bicing discrimina a los ciudadanos de la Unión Europea sin DNI o NIE | La Voz de Barcelona
  Wikileaks en versión española. SUR.es

External links 
 
  Asuntos propios – Primera hora – iVoox

Political advocacy groups in Spain
Whistleblowing